The Military ranks of the Kingdom of Hungary were the military insignia used by the Kingdom of Hungary. Following the fall of the monarchy, the ranks were replaced with those of the Hungarian People's Army.

Commissioned officer ranks 
The rank insignia of commissioned officers.

Other ranks 
The rank insignia of non-commissioned officers and enlisted personnel.

References 
Citations

Bibliography

External links 
 

Hungary, Kingdom
Military of Hungary